The 39th Evacuation Hospital was part of the Medical Branch of the United States Army during World War II. It received the Meritorious Unit Commendation for service rendered during the Battle of the Bulge.

The following are the members of 39th Evacuation Hospital:

Clint E. Adams, Harry Adams (Maj, MC), Monica Ames, Paul Anderson, Dotty Ayers, Burlah Barkley (2d Lt, MAC), Theresa M. Baumgartner (1st Lt, ANC), Ralph Benson, Sam Biondiollie, Alice E. Bowers (2d Lt, ANC), Allen N. Bracher (Col, MC), George Breslin, Arthur A. Brown (Lt Col, MC), Howard F. Bultman, Mary S. Clarke, Fred Conti, Marilyn G. Cook (1st Lt, ANC), Gene Dent, George J. DeWitt (Chaplain, ChC), Pat Donofrio, Erma L. Davis, Isabelle Dick, William Downing	Hazel Dukes (2d Lt, ANC, N-764441), Bernard Elmore, Sylvia Faruzzi, Tom Ferrater, Arthur Fladhammer, William Foster, Robert Gardner, Herbert Gershberg (Capt, MC), James Ghiardi, M. Gibbons, Alice Gitterson, Wilbert Gohring, Mildred Gotts, Eddie L. Griffin (1st Lt, ANC, N-726750), Lewis Hammon, Jeffrey Hanson, Jeff Hausen, Shirley W. Hayden, Stan Helberg, Vance C. Henry, Walter Hervi, Richard Hewitt, Willa R. Hinkle (1st Lt, ANC), Mary C. Hohl (1st Lt, ANC), Connie Hood, Robert Jacus, Annie L. Jennings (1st Lt, ANC, N-763368), Eddie Jonas, Marie J. Joenneke (1st Lt, ANC, N-763070), Byrle Johnson	Ruth B. Johnson (1st Lt, ANC, N-727739), Tom Judge, Anne G. Kagel, Charles Kaman, Rose P. Kelly (1st Lt, ANC), John Kennedy, Robert Kieffer (Chaplain, ChC), Garnet Kimberlin, Clarence Knecht, Rex Koener, Frank Kojick, Hilda Kope, Albert K. Kruger, Walter Kubic, Carl P. Kulinsky (Pfc), Roy W. Kyllander (Tec 5, 37305495), Ruth Lamoureux, Frank LaPosa, Eddie Leverty, Alan Lewis, Phyllis A. Lindmeier (1st Lt, ANC), Angela Loiacoia, Ed Mancene, Paul Marrow, Dorothy Maxson (Chief Nurse, ANC), Laura McConnell, Robert M. McKinnis, Elmer Miller, Mary E. Morefield (1st Lt, ANC), Mary Murphy, Lloyd Nicholson, Harry Nightingale, Elizabeth O’Reilly (1st Lt, ANC, N-727943), James R. Ognibene, Deloy A. Palmer, Robert Parent, Genaro Porta Della, Isabelle Preston, Pete Procci, Bernard L. Rabold (Maj, MC), Norman Rasmussen, Alfred Richlan, Catherine Robinson, David Robinson, Mona A. Ruark, Frank E. Rubovits, Norman R. Ruschill, Clarence Sandro, John J. Scanlon (Major, MC), Rene Schmidt, Arthur Scott, Armand Sevasta, Winton E. Simpson (1st Lt, ANC, N-763819), Roy Slusher, James Sneberger, Dagny Solberg, Mildred Sone, Gladys C. Stinson (1st Lt, ANC), Theresa Sullivan, Lois M. Telmes (1st Lt, ANC, N-727005), Bernice Tonjes (1st Lt, ANC), Mary Vaughn, Bert Vaszily, Paul Vehle, James Vincent, Lloyd Walters, Mert Warbritten, Alta M. White (1st Lt, ANC, N-727186), Al Wolfson, Tietz Woodruff, Lester Wygant

See also
List of former United States Army medical units

References

0039